The  is a constituency of the House of Representatives in the Diet of Japan (national legislature). It is located in Tokyo and covers parts of the former city of Tokyo and Tokyo's outlying islands. The district consists of the wards of Shinagawa and parts of Ōta, the towns of Ōshima and Hachijō and the villages of Toshima, Niijima, Kōzushima, Miyake, Mikurajima, Aogashima and Ogasawara. As of 2012, 482,494 eligible voters were registered in the district.

Before the electoral reform of 1994, the area had been part of Tokyo 2nd district where five Representatives had been elected by single non-transferable vote.

Former representative from the Tokyo 3rd district was Hirotaka Ishihara (Liberal Democratic Party of Japan, LDP), the son of former prefectural governor and environment minister Shintarō Ishihara (Japan Restoration Party, formerly LDP) and brother of former environment minister Nobuteru Ishihara (LDP). In 2012, Ishihara narrowly beat incumbent Jin Matsubara (DPJ, Hatoyama and Kawabata groups) who began his political career in 1985 as a candidate for the Tokyo Metropolitan Assembly for the New Liberal Club and later represented Ōta in the Metropolitan Assembly as an independent with Zekin-tō ("Tax Party") support, subsequently joined the LDP, the Japan Renewal Party (JRP), the New Frontier Party (NFP), the Liberal Party, the Good Governance Party (GGP) and finally the Democratic Party (DPJ) in 1998.

List of representatives

Election results

References 

Districts of the House of Representatives (Japan)
Politics of Tokyo